"Tonight Carmen" is a song written and recorded by American country music artist Marty Robbins.  It was released in May 1967 as the first single and title track from the album Tonight Carmen.  The song was Robbins' twelfth number one on the country charts, spending one week at number one and total of twelve weeks on the charts.

Chart performance

References
 

1967 singles
Marty Robbins songs
Songs written by Marty Robbins
Song recordings produced by Bob Johnston
Columbia Records singles
1967 songs